Shady Grove may refer to:
Shady Grove, Angelina County, Texas
Shady Grove, Burnet County, Texas
Shady Grove, Cherokee County, Texas
Shady Grove, Cooke County, Texas
Shady Grove, Dallas County, Texas
Shady Grove, Fannin County, Texas
Shady Grove, Houston County, Texas
Shady Grove, Kerr County, Texas
Shady Grove, Nacogdoches County, Texas
Shady Grove, Panola County, Texas
Shady Grove, Rains County, Texas
Shady Grove, Smith County, Texas
Shady Grove, Upshur County, Texas